Wannes Van de Velde (29 April 1937 – 10 November 2008), born Willy Cecile Johannes Van de Velde, in Antwerp, was a Flemish folk singer, guitarist, musician, poet, puppeteer and artist. He is most famous for his songs Ik Wil deze Nacht in de Straten Verdwalen (1973), Mijn Mansarde and De Brug van Willebroek (1990). His work is often categorized as kleinkunst. Van de Velde was known for singing in his local dialect.

Biography

His father, Jaak Van de Velde, was a metal worker and talented singer, his mother a housewife and singer. He grew up in the Zirkstraat, near the Antwerp Red Light district.  At home the young boy was always surrounded by music.

His song "Ik Wil Deze Nacht in De Straten Verdwalen" was written for the film Home Sweet Home by Benoît Lamy.

In 1997 he received the Arkprijs van het Vrije Woord.

Van de Velde died at Antwerp on 10 November 2008, aged 71.

Awards
 1997 -  Arkprijs van het Vrije Woord for his music.

References

1937 births
2008 deaths
20th-century Belgian male singers
20th-century Belgian singers
Belgian folk singers
Belgian male guitarists
Belgian male poets
Belgian puppeteers
Belgian sculptors
Dutch-language singers of Belgium
Flemish musicians
Musicians from Antwerp
Ark Prize of the Free Word winners
20th-century guitarists